FC CFKiS Lobnya is a Russian football team from Lobnya. It played professionally from 2004 to 2007 in the Russian Second Division, their best result was 3rd place in the Center Zone of 2006.

Team name history
 2000–2003: FC Alla-L Lobnya
 2004–2007: FC Lobnya-Alla Lobnya
 2008–2012: FC Lobnya
 2012: FC Lobnya-Vismut Lobnya
 2013– : FC CFKiS Lobnya

External links
  Team history by footballfacts

Association football clubs established in 2000
Football clubs in Russia
Football in Moscow Oblast
2000 establishments in Russia